Street law may refer to:
Street law, a globally-syndicated program of legal education geared at primary school students
Street Law (1974 film), an Italian movie starring Franco Nero
Street Law (1995 film), an American action film
Street Law (TV series), a Sky One reality television programme
New Street Law, a BBC One television series